Farleigh may refer to:


Places

Australia 
 Farleigh, Queensland

England 
 Farleigh, Somerset
 Farleigh, Surrey
 Farleigh Wallop, Hampshire
 Farleigh School, Hampshire
 Farleigh Hungerford, Somerset
 Farleigh House
 Farleigh Hungerford Castle
 East Farleigh, Kent
 Monkton Farleigh, Wiltshire
 West Farleigh, Kent

People with the surname
 John Farleigh (1900–1965), English wood-engraver
 Lynn Farleigh (born 1942), English actress
 Richard Farleigh (born 1960), Australian private investor

Other uses 
 Newbury Manor School, a special school formerly named Farleigh College

See also
 Farley (disambiguation)